Boris Apostolov (20 January 1925 – 15 January 2009) was a Bulgarian footballer. He competed in the men's tournament at the 1952 Summer Olympics and played for Levski Sofia.

Honours
Levski Sofia
 Bulgarian Cup – 1956, 1957, 1959

References

External links
 
 

1925 births
2009 deaths
Bulgarian footballers
Bulgaria international footballers
Olympic footballers of Bulgaria
Footballers at the 1952 Summer Olympics
Footballers from Sofia
Association football midfielders